The following is a list of colleges and universities in the U.S. state of Montana.

Institutions

Four-year Institutions

Two-year Institutions
City College at Montana State University Billings, two-year college in Billings
Gallatin College Montana State University, two-year college in Bozeman
Great Falls College Montana State University, two-year technical college in Great Falls

Missoula College University of Montana, two-year technical college in Missoula
Helena College University of Montana, two-year technical college in Helena
Highlands College of Montana Tech, two-year college in Butte
Bitterroot College of the University of Montana, two-year college in Hamilton

Tribal colleges 
Aaniiih Nakoda College, Harlem 
Blackfeet Community College, Browning
Chief Dull Knife College, Lame Deer
Fort Peck Community College, Poplar

 Little Big Horn College, Crow Agency

Salish Kootenai College, Pablo
Stone Child College, Box Elder

See also 
 List of college athletic programs in Montana
 Higher education in the United States
 List of American institutions of higher education
 List of recognized higher education accreditation organizations
 List of colleges and universities
 List of colleges and universities by country

References

External links
Department of Education listing of accredited institutions in Montana

Montana
Colleges and universities